The 48th (South Midland) Division was an infantry division of the British Army. Part of the Territorial Force (TF) and raised in 1908, the division was originally called the South Midland Division, and was redesignated as the 48th (South Midland) Division in 1915. During the First World War, the division saw service on the Western Front before being transferred to the Italian Front in November 1917 and remaining there for the rest of the war.

Reformed in 1920 in the Territorial Army (TA) as the 48th (South Midland) Infantry Division, it saw active service in the Second World War with the British Expeditionary Force (BEF) in Belgium and France before being evacuated from Dunkirk to the United Kingdom. It was converted into a training reserve division in December 1942, remaining in the United Kingdom in that status for the rest of the war. Disbanded after the war, the division was not reformed again. In both world wars, the division raised a second line reserve formation; the 61st (2nd South Midland) Division in the First World War, and 61st Division in the Second World War.

Formation
In 1901, following lessons learned from the Second Boer War and diplomatic clashes with the growing German Empire, the United Kingdom sought to reform the British Army so it would be able to engage in European affairs if required. This task fell to Secretary of State for War, Richard Haldane who implemented several policies known as the Haldane Reforms. As part of these reforms, the Territorial and Reserve Forces Act 1907 created a new Territorial Force by merging the existing Yeomanry and Volunteer Force in 1908. This resulted in the creation of 14 Territorial Divisions, including the South Midland Division.

As part of the legislation, the territorials were only liable to serve within the United Kingdom. Haldane envisioned that the territorials would take over the defence of the country against what was perceived as a very real threat of invasion, which would allow the regular army to be deployed aboard. In addition, Haldane saw the territorials as a source of reinforcements for the regular army. Six months following mobilisation, during which time the troops would have come up to an acceptable training standard, Haldane was confident that up to a quarter of the men would opt to go and fight abroad.

The 1910 edition of the Hazell's Annual reported that, in 1909, "The South Midland Division ... had 13 units up to or over establishment, and the others very little below it." The following year, the Territorial Force as a whole peaked at a strength of 276,000 men; 26,000 men short of the peacetime establishment set by Haldane's reforms. However, between 1910 and 1914, the overall strength of the force had declined to 250,000, 52,000 short of the peacetime establishment. In peacetime, the divisional headquarters was in the Old Barracks in Warwick.

First World War

1914

In August 1914, the South Midland Division departed for its annual summer training camp. The 143rd (Warwickshire) Brigade, for example, departed for Rhyl in northern Wales. Following the declaration of war, the division was mobilised and moved south to take up defensive positions along the southern coast. Due to German-invasion scares, the division-numbering 6,000 men-moved to Essex. While there was no invasion, the division remained in the area on defensive duties and to continue training.

During the opening weeks of the war, as the Territorials were not required to be deployed overseas, the troops were asked to volunteer. By the end of August, more than 70 battalions across the Territorial Force had volunteered with the number rising higher as the year progressed. The members of the division who did not, or were not able to, volunteer for overseas service, were transferred to newly created second line units intended for home defence. These second line units were eventually formed into the 61st (2nd South Midland) Division and, following the passing of the Military Service Act 1916, deployed to France in February 1916. In March 1915, with the threat of a German invasion having subsided, the South Midland Division was dispatched to France with the territorials who had volunteered for overseas service.

1915–1918

On the outbreak of war, the division composed the Warwickshire Brigade, the Gloucester and Worcester Brigade and the South Midland Brigade. The division was redesignated the 48th (South Midland) Division, and its brigades became the 143rd (Warwickshire) Brigade, 144th (Gloucester and Worcester) Brigade and 145th (South Midland) Brigade respectively. The division was sent to France in March 1915 and served on the Western Front. It took part in the Battle of the Somme in 1916, the Battle of Pozières and the Third Battle of Ypres. In November 1917, the division was sent to Italy, where it remained until the end of the War. It fought the on Asiago Plateau (15–16 June 1918) and the Battle of Vittorio Veneto.

Interwar
After the war, the 48th Divisional Signal Company was posted to Iran as part of Norperforce.
The division was disbanded in June 1919, along with the rest of the Territorial Force. However, the Territorial Force was reformed in 1920 as the Territorial Army (TA) and the 48th Division was reconstituted as the 48th (South Midland) Infantry Division.

During the interwar period, the British Army envisioned that, during future conflicts, the Territorial Army would be used as the basis for future expansion so as to avoid raising a new Kitchener's Army. However, as the 1920s and 1930s wore on, the British Government prioritised funding for the regular army over the territorials, allowing recruitment and equipment levels to languish. Baron Templemore, as part of a House of Lords debate on the Territorial Army, stated that the division - on 1 October 1924 - mustered 338 officers and 7,721 other ranks. Historian David French highlights that "by April 1937 the Territorial Army had reached less than 80 per cent of its shrunken peacetime establishment" and "Its value as an immediate reserve was, therefore, limited." Edward Smalley comments that "48th Divisional Signals operated on an improvised organizational structure" for most of the 1930s, due to being below 50 per cent strength. He further highlights how the TA, and the division in particular, "never kept pace with technological developments." In 1937, the division was operating just two radio sets on a full-time basis and had to borrow additional units from the 3rd Infantry Division for annual training camps.

Second World War

On the outbreak of the Second World War, the 48th Division was mobilised in early September 1939, under the command of Major General Frank Roberts, who had won the Victoria Cross (VC) in the Great War. After spending a few months in England training the division, now commanded by Major General Sir Andrew Thorne after Roberts' retirement in December, landed in France in early January 1940 and became part of the British Expeditionary Force (BEF), the first complete division of the TA to do so. The division came under command of Lieutenant General Sir John Dill's I Corps. Soon after their arrival, the 48th Division exchanged some of its units with the Regular divisions. For example, in the 143rd Brigade, the 5th Battalion, Northamptonshire Regiment was exchanged with the 1st Battalion, Oxfordshire and Buckinghamshire Light Infantry, a Regular Army unit, and transferred to the 11th Infantry Brigade, of the 4th Infantry Division. This was official policy within the BEF and was, in theory, intended to strengthen the inexperienced Territorial divisions with experienced Regulars.

France and Dunkirk
When the Germans invaded France and the Low Countries on 10 May 1940, the BEF moved forward to occupy pre-planned positions in Belgium, but the rapid German breakthrough into France caused it to retreat towards Dunkirk.

On 23 May, 48th Division was pulled out to form a new defence line along the canal between Saint-Omer and the coast. The divisional Commander, Royal Artillery, Brigadier Edward Lawson, was sent with 'X Force' of artillery, machine guns and infantry ahead of the division to occupy the chosen positions. However, the unexpected surrender of Belgian forces on 27 May 1940 led to a gap appearing between 48th Division in action around Saint-Omer and the coast at Nieuwpoort. Until II Corps could arrive to plug this gap, Lawson was responsible for what the Official History calls 'the most dangerously exposed part of the bridgehead'. He was ordered by the commander of the Dunkirk perimeter, the III Corps commander Lieutenant-General Ronald Adam, to improvise a defence line along the canal and prevent the Germans breaking through to the vital beaches east of Dunkirk where much of the BEF was waiting to be evacuated. At 11.00 on 28 May, advanced German troops reached the canal line, but Lawson seized on the Territorial gunners of the 53rd (London) Medium Regiment, RA who were marching towards Dunkirk having fired off all their ammunition and destroyed their guns. Together with detachments of Regular gunners from both the 2nd Medium and 1st Heavy Anti-Aircraft Regiments, and sappers from 7th Field Company, Royal Engineers, they fought as infantry to hold the line. They came under heavy mortar and machine gun fire, and the Germans seized a bridgehead at Nieuwpoort, but all subsequent attacks that day were repulsed. Brigadier Lawson's scratch force was relieved next day and then evacuated to Britain.

Home defence and training
The 48th Division, much depleted in numbers, completed its return to the United Kingdom on 1 June. The division, commanded from 18 June by Major General Roderic Petre, was subsequently posted to Western Command, Southern Command, and VIII Corps under Lieutenant General Harold Franklyn and began training in preparation to repel Operation Sea Lion, the German invasion of England, which proved abortive.

During the war, the divisions of the British Army were divided between "Higher Establishment" and "Lower Establishment" formations. The former were intended for deployment overseas for field operations, whereas the latter were strictly for home defence in a static role. During November 1941, the division was placed on the "Lower Establishment" and assigned to I Corps District, commanded by Lieutenant General Henry Willcox.

During the winter of 1942–43, the British Army overhauled its training of recruits. The 48th was one of three divisions that were changed from "Lower Establishment" units to "Reserve Divisions". On 20 December, the division was renamed the 48th Infantry (Reserve) Division, becoming a training formation in the process. This reorganisation took place during 1943 and the division held this training role for the remainder of the war. These three divisions were supplemented by a fourth training formation (the 80th Infantry (Reserve) Division), which was raised on 1 January 1943. The 48th Infantry (Reserve) Division was assigned to Northern Command Soldiers who had completed their corps training were sent to these training divisions. The soldiers were given five weeks of additional training at the section, platoon and company level, before undertaking a final three-day exercise. Troops would then be ready to be sent overseas to join other formations. Training was handled in this manner to relieve the "Higher Establishment" divisions from being milked for replacements for other units and to allow them to intensively train without having to cope with recruits. During this period, from 17 October 1942 until 30 September 1943, the 10th Tank Brigade was assigned to the division for the holding and training of reinforcements to armoured units. On 7 November 1943, the 145th Infantry Brigade was disbanded.

On 30 June 1944, the 48th Infantry (Reserve) Division, along with the other training divisions (the 76th, 77th, and the 80th), had a combined total of 22,355 men. Of this number, only 1,100 were immediately available as replacements for the 21st Army Group, at the time of Operation Overlord and the Battle of Normandy. The remaining 21,255 men were considered ineligible for service abroad due to a variety of reasons, ranging from medical, not being considered fully fit or insufficiently trained. Over the following six months, up to 75 per cent of these men were deployed to reinforce the 21st Army Group, following the completion of their training and having met the required fitness levels. In 2007, Stephen Hart wrote that, by September, the 21st Army Group "had bled Home Forces dry of draftable riflemen", due to the losses suffered in the Battle of Normandy, leaving the army in Britain (with the exception of the 52nd (Lowland) Infantry Division) with just "young lads, old men and the unfit".

Due to the decreased need for such a formation, the division was disbanded after the war on 1 November 1945.

Postwar
The division was not reformed in the Territorial Army in 1947. In 1961 the division became a district headquarters as 48th (South Midland) Division/District, and it was disbanded on the reduction of the TA into the Territorial and Army Volunteer Reserve on 1 April 1967, when many individual TA units lost their identities. The district headquarters itself formed the core of the structure for the creation of West Midlands District under HQ UK Land Forces in 1972.

General officer commanding

Commanders included:

See also

 Charles Carrington, a member of the division and subsequent author.
 Ronald Poulton-Palmer, captain of the England national rugby union team and a member of the division who was killed in 1915.

Notes
 Footnotes

 Citations

References

 
 
 
 Sir Arthur Bryant, The Turn of the Tide, 1939–1943, London: Collins, 1957.
 Lt-Col Ewan Butler and Maj J.S. Bradford, The Story of Dunkirk, London: Hutchinson/Arrow, nd.
 
 
 Major L. F. Ellis, History of the Second World War, United Kingdom Military Series: The War in France and Flanders 1939–1940, London: HM Stationery Office, 1954.
 General Sir Martin Farndale, History of the Royal Regiment of Artillery: Western Front 1914–18, Woolwich: Royal Artillery Institution, 1986, .
 
 
 
 
 
 
 
 
 
 Cliff Lord & Graham Watson, Royal Corps of Signals: Unit Histories of the Corps (1920–2001) and its Antecedents, Solihull: Helion, 2003, .
 
 
 
 
 Huw Richards, 'Lawson, Edward Frederick, fourth Baron Burnham (1890–1963)', Oxford Dictionary of National Biography, Oxford: University Press, 2004–15.

External links 
 The British Army in the Great War: The 48th (South Midland) Division
 The Patriot Files: British Southern Command on 3 September 1939
 53rd London Medium Regiment website
 Richard A. Rinaldi, Royal Engineers, World War I at Orbat.com

Infantry divisions of the British Army in World War I
Infantry divisions of the British Army in World War II
Military units and formations established in 1908
1908 establishments in the United Kingdom